R. Michael Young is a Republican member of the Indiana Senate, representing the 35th District since his appointment in December 2000. He succeeded Morris Mills. He was elected to the Indiana House of Representatives in 1986. In 1992, Young was redistricted and was reelected to the 92nd district. Young previously served on the Marion County Board of Zoning Appeals from 1980 to 1982. He ran for the United States House of Representatives for Indiana's 4th Congressional District in 2002 and in 2010.

References

External links
 R. Michael Young at Ballotpedia
Our Campaigns – Senator R. Michael Young (IN) profile
 State Senator R. Michael Young official Indiana State Legislature site
 

1951 births
Living people
Republican Party Indiana state senators
Republican Party members of the Indiana House of Representatives
Politicians from Indianapolis
21st-century American politicians